Kresley Cole is an American bestselling author of paranormal romance and young adult novels. She has received three Romance Writers of America (RWA) RITA Awards and was inducted into the RWA Hall of Fame in 2009.

Biography
Kresley Cole is the #1 New York Times bestselling author of the Immortals After Dark paranormal series, the young adult Arcana Chronicles series, the erotic Gamemakers series, and five award-winning historical romances.

A master’s grad and former athlete, she has traveled over much of the world and draws from those experiences to create her memorable characters and settings.

Her books have been translated into 23 languages, garnered 3 RITA awards, a Hall of Fame induction, and consistently appear on the bestseller lists, in the U.S. and abroad.

Cole lives in Florida with her family.

Bibliography

The Immortals After Dark series (Paranormal Romance)

 
 
 
 
 
 
 
  (Duology with Gena Showalter)

Short Stories
 "The Warlord Wants Forever" in the anthology Playing Easy to Get (Pocket, 2006)  - introduces the Immortals After Dark series.

The Arcana Chronicles series (Young Adult Fiction)
1.  
2.  
3.  
4.   short stories 
5.  
6.  
7.

The Game Maker series (Contemporary Romance)

The MacCarrick Brothers trilogy (Historical Romance)

The Sutherland Brothers series (Historical Romance)

Awards and reception
2007 - Romance Writers of America RITA Award Winner for Best Paranormal Romance for A Hunger Like No Other
2010 - Romance Writers of America RITA Award Winner for Best Paranormal Romance with Kiss of a Demon King
2010 - Romance Writers of America RITA Award Finalist for Best Paranormal Romance with Untouchable/Deep Kiss of Winter
2013 - Romance Writers of America RITA Award Finalist for Best Paranormal Romance with Lothaire
2013 - Romance Writers of America RITA Award Winner for Best Paranormal Romance with Shadow's Claim
2013 - Inducted as only the 14th member of the Romance Writers of America Hall of Fame
2013 - Amazon Best Books of 2013 with Endless Knight
2015 - Audie Award Nominee with Pleasure of a Dark Prince
2015 - RT Book Reviews Top Pick Gold Rating for Dead of Winter
Kresley placed #1 on the New York Times Bestseller List the week of February 8, 2009 with Kiss of a Demon King and again on March 6, 2011 with Dreams of a Dark Warrior.
Kresley placed in the Top 7 on the New York Times Bestseller List in three different genres in a six-month span.

References

External links
Kresley Cole official site
The Arcana Chronicles official site
Printable Kresley Cole Book & Series List

21st-century American novelists
American romantic fiction writers
Living people
American paranormal romance writers
American historical novelists
American young adult novelists
American women novelists
RITA Award winners
Women writers of young adult literature
21st-century American women writers
Women historical novelists
Women romantic fiction writers
Year of birth missing (living people)